Erisipela de la costa is an acute phase of onchocerciasis characterized by swelling of the face with erythema and itching. Onchocerciasis causes different kinds of skin changes and these changes vary in different geographic regions.  This skin change, erisípela de la costa, of acute onchocerciasis is most commonly seen among victims in Central and South America.

See also 
 List of cutaneous conditions

References 

Parasitic infestations, stings, and bites of the skin